Torretta is a surname. Notable people with the surname include:

 Gaspare Torretta (1883–1910), Italian athlete
 Gino Torretta (born 1970), American football player
 Margherita Torretta (born 1986), Italian concert pianist
 Pietro Torretta ( 1912– 975), member of the Sicilian Mafia